Disciflorae are an artificial group of plants based on the old second artificial and non scientific series. The group Disciflorae are polypetalae and dicotyledonous. The group comprises:

 Flowers having prominent disc shaped thalamus below the ovary. The ovary is superior.

Previous Order
 Polypetalae, Dicotyledons

Historically recognized angiosperm taxa